Seymour W. Duncan is an American guitarist, guitar repairman, and a co-founder of the Seymour Duncan Company, a manufacturer of guitar pickups, bass pickups, and effects pedals located in Santa Barbara, California.

Life and career 
Born in New Jersey, Duncan attended Woodstown High School. He grew up in the 1950s and 1960s, during a time when electric guitar music grew into greater acceptance. In a 1984 interview  Duncan talks about when he started to play guitar:

I guess when I was about 13. I used to watch the Ted Mack Show and the Ricky Nelson Show and watch James Burton play who was, and still is, one of my favourite guitar players. He was one of the big influences on Tele sounds - you know I basically play Telecasters and Fender Strats.

Duncan began playing clubs and during one show, his Fender Telecaster's bridge pickup broke, forcing him to play the rest of the night on the neck pickup. Necessity being the mother of invention, Duncan rewound that bridge pickup on a record player spinning at 33 rpm.

While he developed his playing skills, Duncan's knowledge of how guitars work grew. Duncan took every chance he had to talk with players about guitars, tone and electronics. After spending time with musicians such as Les Paul and Roy Buchanan, Duncan realized that it was his guitar, and not his playing, that prevented him from producing those wonderful tones that defined great players. Suddenly, and forever, Duncan was hooked on the dynamics and character differences of pickups.

As Duncan tinkered with materials and techniques, his bag of tricks grew and grew. At Les Paul's suggestion, he moved to England in the late 1960s where his intention to play soon mixed with the opportunity to further his pickup research working in the Repair and R&D Departments at the Fender Soundhouse in London. It was here that he did repairs and rewinds for such artists as Jimmy Page, George Harrison, Eric Clapton, David Gilmour, Pete Townshend, Peter Frampton and his guitar hero Jeff Beck. It was through his work with Beck in particular, that Duncan honed his pickup winding skills—some of Duncan's first signature pickup tones appear on Beck's early solo albums. Duncan's sabbatical in England resulted in a flock of new fans and friends.
Duncan came back to the United States and eventually settled in California. He established contact with people such as Leo Fender, Les Paul and Seth Lover (inventor of a humbucking pickup) and continued learning about and making pickups. Demand for his custom pickups grew and in late 1978 together with Cathy Carter Duncan, he started his own company, Seymour Duncan Pickups. Today the company has over 120 employees.

Fender Custom Shop makes a Seymour Duncan Signature Esquire. Duncan is still involved in designing and fabricating pickups at the factory as well as playing guitar and making appearances at clinics and conventions.

As a performer Duncan has guested on the albums of several artists.  He has also been the lead guitarist for the Stone Age Institute Band.

Albums

References

External links
Seymour Duncan Company site
D-TAR (Duncan-Turner Acoustic Research) website

American luthiers
Living people
Guitarists from New Jersey
Woodstown High School alumni
1951 births
20th-century American guitarists